Zak Abdel (born July 20, 1961, Cairo, Egypt) is a former professional soccer player and now professional goalkeeping coach.

Career
Abdel had a 16-year professional playing career for Ghazl El Mahalla SC of the Egyptian First Division, winning two championships.

He has worked in international football as goalkeeper coach for the USMNT (2007–2011) and the Egypt national football team (2011–2014) and the Canada men's national soccer team.

He worked as the goalkeeper coach at MLS soccer club LA Galaxy for 7 years, as well as with the now defunct Chivas USA.

He was announced in the goalkeeping coach role at the newly formed Los Angeles FC ahead of their inaugural season in 2018, working under former National team coach Bob Bradley, with whom he has consistently worked for a number of years.

On 20 July 2019, Abdel had an altercation with Zlatan Ibrahimović, following elbowing Mohamed El Monir.

References

1961 births
Living people
LA Galaxy non-playing staff
Footballers from Cairo
Los Angeles FC non-playing staff
Ghazl El Mahalla SC players
Association football goalkeepers
Chivas USA non-playing staff
Egyptian footballers
Association football goalkeeping coaches